Erysichthon or Erisichthon may refer to:

 Erysichthon of Thessaly, the Aeolid Erysichthon, the son of Triopas
 Erysichthon of Attica, the Cecropid Erysichthon, the son of Cecrops I
 Erysichthon of Phlegra, the son of Gaia

See also
 Erysichton [sic], a genus of butterfly